Baba is a 2002 Indian Tamil-language supernatural action film written and produced by Rajinikanth under his banner Lotus International, directed by Suresh Krissna, with cinematography by Chota K. Naidu. Along with Rajinikanth in the title role and Manisha Koirala in the female lead, the film features an ensemble supporting cast.  The original songs and background score were composed by A.R. Rahman.

The film's story is about a carefree young non-believer of supreme power, Baba, who is a reincarnation of a great saint from the Himalayas. After several twists and problems caused by corrupt local politicians, Baba is taken to Mahavatar Babaji, whom Baba was a follower of in his last life. Baba gets tested by the deity to overcome several illusions of the materialistic world and is given seven chances of wishes. How he uses the wishes while developing spirituality and falling into loggerheads with the villains at the same time forms the rest of the story.

First released in 2002, the film met with mixed critical reviews and was a box-office failure, resulting in Rajinikanth reimbursing distributors for their losses. But over the years, the film gained cult following, as a result of which the film was digitally remastered, re-edited with a shorter duration and an alternate ending, and re-released by Lyca Productions on 10 December 2022, twenty years after its original release, coinciding with Rajinikanth's birthday weekend. The re-released film was declared a commercial success in the box office.

Plot
The film opens with the birth of Baba (Rajinikanth), who is the reincarnation of a saint that was a devotee of Mahavatar Babaji. Baba grows up as a atheist and hot-blooded man, but becomes a good samaritan with his thoughts and actions. His lifestyle includes consuming alcohol, smoking beedi, and chewing tobacco. His mother (Sujatha) and maternal uncle (M. N. Nambiar), for whom Baba has great respect and love, are ardent devotees of Mahavatar Babaji. Chamundeswari (Manisha Koirala) stays in the neighbourhood of Baba's residence which often quarrels with Baba but eventually falls in love with his style and attitude.

Baba involves in a physical feud with the son (Riyaz Khan) of the state Deputy chief minister Ippo Ramaswamy (Ashish Vidyarthi) for the former had interfered with the sale of land by his neighbour. Ramasamy is the current leader of a party in the ruling coalition. Ramaswamy demolishes Baba's colony in retaliation for hurting his son. When Baba is about to confront Ramaswamy, Baba's mother urges him to maintain calm and not meet Ramaswamy. Baba decides to work hard to rebuild the colony and joins as a labourer in his neighbour's shop and earns money. Chamundeswari's mother, upon seeing this, threatens Chamundeswari with homicide if she does not heed to her words of marrying someone else. Chamundeswari is left with no choice and tells Baba that she is not willing to marry a daily labourer. Then Baba realizes that so far, he has been only answerable for his mother. And if he gets married, then he has to live for his wife and kids and would become answerable to them. He feels that Prema (love) is Maya (illusion) and immediately breaks up with her.

Later, a dishevelled sadhu, Divyananda Bharathi, approaches him and tell him that it is time for enlightenment. Baba is taken to the Himalayas, where he meets Mahavatar Babaji, who tests him by granting seven mantras (wishes; five in the remastered version) to Baba. He can use these mantras anytime he likes; but unbeknownst to him, if he happened to use the mantras for his own personal gains, the karma of rebirth is bound to follow him forever. Baba is sent back to Chennai but baffled, he decides to test one of the mantras by wishing a kite to come and fall in his hand. He waits for a few seconds and decides that it was all his illusion, but the kite follows him to his house and falls on his hand. He feels that it is coincidental and tries the second mantra on a different kite to fall on his lap. He goes into his house and closes all the possible entries into the house. But the kite makes its way and falls on his lap.  In the meantime, Chamundeeswari learns of Baba's origins from his mother that he is a reincarnation of a saint who had disobeyed Babaji and that he himself does not know so and tries to patch up with him. Baba retorts by saying that he no longer loves her, leaving her heartbroken.

Despite the mantras coming true, Baba remains skeptical and tests the other two mantras for trivial things. His uncle scolds him for his pointless skepticism in spite of the truth and develops chest pain then. While on his death-bed, his uncle tells Baba to use a mantra to renovate his surroundings that will finally instill his belief in Babaji, and he dies. As predicted, the use of the fifth mantra causes the government officials to renovate Baba's area. Baba learns the truth and ends his tryst with alcohol, and reforms himself spiritually. He reserves the remaining two mantras for his mother. However, he uses the penultimate mantra to revive a newlywed Japanese neighbour fighting for his life due to food poisoning. Meanwhile, Ramaswamy learns about the mantras from Baba's two-timing companion.

Purushottaman, the current chief minister of Tamil Nadu, wants to become the permanent CM of the state using Baba's boons, which Baba refuses. He threatens Baba's mother and also tries to kill him, but fails. Baba's friends Annamalai, Perusu, Samundi, Kathirika urge him to use the final wish to become the permanent CM himself as the state would be great under him. But Baba uses the last wish on Kanthan, an old honest party member of Ramasamy, to become the next CM with a single greater majority. Then, by the wish, Ramasamy's paralysed father (the first leader of the party) wants to prove that the older generation is better as his son is reckless. The elections come, and Kanthan becomes CM. Ramaswamy calls a tantric Guruji, to foil Baba's magical powers. Guruji asks Ramaswamy and Purushottaman to bring the chain in Baba's neck and his backbone to nullify the effects of the mantras. A fight ensues, with Baba's mother getting mortally wounded by Ramaswamy and Baba himself knocked unconscious by the henchmen. They try to kill him by burning him in a pyre. Their attempts fail when a temple elephant puts out the fire, with Baba regaining consciousness and battering the villains badly. When Baba is about to kill Ramaswamy and Purushottaman, Divyananda Bharathi stops him. Baba's dying mother advises Baba to leave the world and ascend to the Himalayas and dies in his arms. Baba decides to live under Babaji's tutelage since he now disdains living in the materialistic world without his mother.

As Baba is just about to ascend to the Himalayas, the new chief minister Kandhan is assassinated by Ippo Ramasamy's son. In a change of mind, Baba turns back to remain in Tamil Nadu, to the cheer of the crowds that were hopeful that he leads the state.

In the re-edited 2022 re-release, Baba ascends to the Himalayas and meets Mahavatar Babaji, who tells him he had not served his mother, a virtue even more important than helping others. Baba is told than he would be reincarnated once again to the same mother, after which he will be allowed to return to the Himalayas.

Cast

 Rajinikanth as Baba and Mahavatar Babaji (voice only)
 Manisha Koirala as Chamundeeswari (Voice dubbed by Durga)
 Goundamani as Annamalai
 Sujatha as Baba's mother
 Ashish Vidhyarthi as Ippo Ramaswamy, deputy chief minister of Tamil Nadu
 M. N. Nambiar as Baba's maternal uncle
 Vijayakumar as Chamundeeswari's father
 Sayaji Shinde as Divyananda Bharathi
 Bharat Dabholkar as Chief Minister Purushothaman (voice dubbed by Murali Kumar)
 Kitty as Bhai
 Delhi Ganesh as Perusu
 Crane Manohar as Kathirika
 Karunas as Samundi
 Riyaz Khan as Ramaswamy's son
 N. Viswanathan as Baba's father
 Seema as Jagadeeshwari, Chamundeeswari's mother
 Santhoshi as Rajeshwari,  sister
 Vaishnavi as Bhuwaneshwari, Chamundeeswari's sister
 Sanghavi as Lakshmi
 Deepa Venkat as Chamundeeswari's friend
 Vasu Vikram as Baba's treacherous friend
 Amrish Puri as Tantrik

Special appearances in alphabetical order
 Raghava Lawrence in a special appearance in "Maya Maya" song*
 Ramya Krishnan as Neelambari
 Nassar as Suryaprakash
 Prabhu Deva in a special appearance in "Baba Kichu Kichu Tha" song* 
 Radha Ravi as Minister of Tourism
 Sarath Babu as the father of the girl saved by Baba

Production
The film was initially announced with Rajinikanth and Jyothika as the lead pair, for the first time. However the makers decided to replace her with Malayalam heroine Samyuktha Varma, who declined the offer due to other prior commitments and her marriage. Later, Manisha Koirala was roped in.

Soundtrack

A. R. Rahman was approached to compose the original songs and background score of the film. He initially declined the offer because of his busy schedule in London, with Bombay Dreams. He eventually accepted the film while in Ajmer. The songs were recorded in June 2002. Rahman had to supervise the recordings online.

The soundtrack album was released in July 2002 in Chennai. According to Rahman, he tried innovations with Baba, giving more than the jingoistic music that is a characteristic part of a Rajini film. Some of the songs were filmed in Europe.

A controversy regarding the soundtrack originated when lyricist Vairamuthu expressed dissatisfaction over the online recording. Rahman defended this, saying, "Busy as I was with Bombay Dreams, it was simply impossible for me to be in Chennai. Sometimes it is inevitable, in a situation like this, where the reputation and money of somebody else is at stake." Rahman also faced criticisms from the film fraternity for not recording the songs in time.

The Dravidar Kazhagam objected to the lyrics of a song that had to be partially deleted from the film later. They objected to what they called unfair commentary on Periyar E. V. Ramasamy and his ideology.

Rahman introduced Reena Bhardwaj through the song "Kichchu Tha". This song was reused with different instrumentation and vocals in Swades (2004).

Release
This high-budget production was sold at a record price of 17 crore to distributors, but the film yielded a share of 13 crore worldwide. So, Rajinikanth volunteered to return almost 25% of the investment. In Coimbatore distribution territory, Baba was sold for 1.5 crore. This record remained unbroken until Chandramukhi, another Rajnikanth film.

Reception
The film received mixed reviews from critics.
The film was praised for its technical and production values, as well as the performances of the cast, while there was criticism towards the lack of narrative focus in the first half, leading to the film's excessive length and uneven pace. It also left some Rajinikanth fans polarized, with many speculating that the film could be a political campaign of sorts for himself. In contrast, others confused about the message this film was intending to convey.

The film was received with comments such as "the bloom was off the rose" and that "the gold does not glitter any more".

Controversy

Ramadoss, a politician from Pattali Makkal Katchi condemned Rajinikanth for posing with beedis in the film and playing the role of a chain smoker in the film, which glorified smoking and drinking and encouraged Tamil youth to pick up those habits. PMK volunteers attacked theatres which screened the film Baba and usurped film rolls, and burnt it. Amidst such controversies and negative criticism, Rajinikanth kept himself away from acting. Despite this, a few novice directors approached him with scripts, all of which he rejected.

Re-release
The film was digitally remastered and re-released on December 10, 2022, two days before Rajinikanth's birthday, with an alternate ending.
The movie became a sensation and a blockbuster hit after the re-release.

Legacy
The film was noted for its dialogue spoken by Rajinikanth in the film "Katham Katham" (Finish, Finish) gained popularity and also inspired a film of the same name starring Natty and Nandha.

References

External links
 

2002 films
2000s Tamil-language films
Films directed by Suresh Krissna
Films scored by A. R. Rahman
Indian fantasy action films
Films about religion
Films with atheism-related themes